Xyleborus dispar is a species of Xyleborus.

The species was described in 1792 by Fabricius as Apate dispar. Current status was given in 1992 by Wood & Bright.

References

External links

Scolytinae
Beetles described in 1792